Pedraza is a town and municipality of the Colombian Department of Magdalena.

History
Was founded in 1791 by Pablo José Torregrosa. On December 9, 1908 by Executive Decree 1312 Pedraza became a municipality of the Magdalena Department.

Geography and climate
Pedraza's contours are slightly plane with certain undulations as high as 120 meters.

Hydrography
Localized near the ciénaga de Cocore, ciénaga de La Brava, ciénaga de La Palma, ciénaga de Pajaral, ciénaga de Pato, ciénaga de Zapayan, ciénaga de Zarzal and ciénaga de Molino. The streams of Cerezos, Iguanera, Jeremías, La Soledad, Los Coquitos and Patos also flow through the area of Pedraza.

Political division
Corregimientos and caseríos: 
 Bahía Honda
 Bomba
 Guaiquirí
 Heredia.

Economy
Pedraza's main economic activity is farming with an emphasis on breeding livestock such as cattle, pork, equines, goats, and mules. Agriculture production is also part of its economy, predominantly yuca, corn, tomato, beans. Artisan fishing is also practiced on the many marshes and streams in the area.

Attractions
Pedraza offers ecotourism sites surrounding Ciénaga La Brava and Riveras del Río.

Historical sites
Iglesia San Pedro (Saint Peter church), Antiguo Palacio Municipal (Former Cityhall Palace) and the Parque Central (central park).

Festivities
The town celebrates Carnivals from February through March, while also participating of the Holy Week,  Fiesta de la Conversión de San Pablo (Saint Peter's Conversion Feast) every January 25 and the Día del Sagrado Corazón de Jesús (The Sacred Heart of Jesus Day) every June 14.

References

External links
 Pedraza official website
 Gobernacion del Magdalena - Pedraza

Municipalities of Magdalena Department